Ermanno is an Italian masculin given name. It is a variant of the name Herman.

People bearing the name include:
 Ermanno Stradelli (1852–1926),  Italian explorer, geographer and photographer
 Ermanno Wolf-Ferrari (1876–1948),  Italian composer and teacher
 Ermanno Aebi (1892–1976),  Italian-Swiss footballer 
  (1914–2015),  Italian aeronautical engineer and designer
 Ermanno Randi (1920–1951),  Italian film actor
 Ermanno Gorrieri (1920–2004),  Italian politician and economist
 Ermanno Rea (1927–2016),  Italian novelist, essayist and journalist
 Ermanno Olmi (1931–2018), Italian film director and screenwriter
 Ermanno Mauro (b. 1939),  Italian-Canadian operatic tenor 
 Ermanno Corsi (b. 1939),  Italian journalist and writer
 Ermanno Daelli,  Italian fashion designer
 Ermanno Capelli (b. 1985),  Italian road racing cyclist

Italian masculine given names